Colonel Russell Richard Thomas Young,  (25 June 1902 – 1990) was a New Zealand Davis Cup player, army officer, and corporate executive.

Early life
Young was born in Wellington on 25 June 1902. His parents were Theodosia Evelyn Young and Arthur Young.

Tennis career
Young went up to Jesus College, Cambridge where he read Chemistry and took a tennis Blue, before pursuing an advanced degree. In 1927, as a member (and later captain) of the Cambridge University Lawn Tennis Club, Young undertook a sporting tour of Germany, with teammates including future Wimbledon finalist Bunny Austin, and the comedian Kenneth Horne. In the same year, Young competed at the Wimbledon Championships in the Men's Doubles.

Young represented New Zealand in the 1928 Davis Cup, reaching the quarter finals. At the outbreak of the Second World War, he was living in London and working as an executive for Shell.

Second World War
Young was commissioned in the New Zealand Military Forces, and fought in North Africa and Italy. As a captain and company commander, he was the only member of the 22nd Battalion to escape after much of the battalion was encircled and captured at Ruweisat Ridge during First Battle of El Alamein. To complete this escape he trekked for four days and nights across the Libyan desert with limited supplies and only the stars to guide him. The commander of the New Zealand Division, Major General Howard Kippenberger recalled in his memoirs that:

Young later served as the Commanding Officer of the Māori Battalion. 

During the Italian Campaign, Young was awarded a Distinguished Service Order by Lieutenant General Sir Bernard Freyberg for his conduct during the Battle of Monte Cassino. During the Rimini assault, Young recorded in his diary:

The Official History of New Zealand in the Second World War 1939–45 records that:

Postwar
Following the Second World War, Young returned to the business world, serving as a corporate director. From 1952, he took up residence in 
Trumpeters' House, one of the surviving Tudor-era buildings in the grounds of Richmond Palace. He died in Surrey in 1990.

References

1902 births
1990 deaths
New Zealand Companions of the Distinguished Service Order
New Zealand Army officers
New Zealand male tennis players
New Zealand military personnel of World War II